Jinge Temple, or "Golden Pavilion Temple", is a Buddhist temple in Shanxi province, China.

The temple is located on Mount Wutai, north of the South Peak and south of the Central Peak, about 15 kilometres from Taihuai town. It is at an altitude of 1,900 meters, the highest besides those temples on the five peaks of Wutai.

Jinge Temple is closely associated with the monk Amoghavajra, an Indian master of Vajrayana Buddhism who lived during the Tang Dynasty. The temple was built to promote the Manjushri, the bodhisattva of wisdom, as the protector of China.

References 

Buddhist temples on Mount Wutai
Buildings and structures in Xinzhou
Tourist attractions in Xinzhou
Wutai County